Sorkheh Dizaj (also Romanized as Sorkheh Dīzaj; also known as Sorkh Dīzaj, Surkh Dazj, and Surkhdeza) is a village in Dast Jerdeh Rural District, Chavarzaq District, Tarom County, Zanjan Province, Iran. At the 2006 census, its population was 313, in 71 families.

References 

Populated places in Tarom County